Ruth Mary Shaw OBE (born 1925 or 1926) is a retired British politician.

Shaw joined the Liberal Party at an early age, and in the 1950s founded the first Young Liberals group in Sutton, London.  She stood repeatedly for the party in the North West ward of the Municipal Borough of Sutton and Cheam, finally winning a seat on her seventh attempt, in 1961.  When the area became part of the London Borough of Sutton, she won election to the new body, and by 1973 was the party's spokesperson on education.

Shaw stood for election in Sutton and Cheam at the 1973 Greater London Council election, winning the seat – one of only two Liberals on the council.  She put her victory down to "community politics" and the party's opposition to the Ringway 3 project.  She was given a place on the council's transport committee.

At the 1977 Greater London Council election, Shaw was the party's campaign manager, but she lost her seat on the council.  However, she was regularly re-elected to the borough council, and was still a member in 1986, when the party won control of the council.  In 2011, she was named as an honorary alderman of the council, and she was made an Officer of the Order of the British Empire in 2013.

References

1920s births
Living people
Councillors in Greater London
Members of the Greater London Council
Liberal Democrats (UK) councillors
Liberal Party (UK) councillors
Officers of the Order of the British Empire
People from the London Borough of Sutton
Women councillors in England